The women's individual competition in archery at the 2022 Mediterranean Games was held from 29 June to 1 July at the Annex Stadium of the Olympic Complex  in Oran.

Qualification round
Results after 72 arrows.

Elimination round
Source:

Section 1

Section 2

Section 3

Section 4

Finals

References

Women's individual
Mediterranean Games